Harold D. Hunter, Ph.D., is a renewal theologian and historian within the Pentecostal movement. He serves the International Pentecostal Holiness Church.

References 

American historians of religion
Living people
Year of birth missing (living people)
Place of birth missing (living people)